Iprocrolol is a beta blocker that was never marketed.

References

Beta blockers
Abandoned drugs
Benzofuran ethers at the benzene ring
N-isopropyl-phenoxypropanolamines
Furanochromones
3-Hydroxypropenals
Pyrogallol ethers